The 2001 William & Mary Tribe football team represented the College of William & Mary as member of the Atlantic 10 Conference (A-10) during the 2001 NCAA Division I-AA football season. Led by Jimmye Laycock in his 22nd year as head coach, William & Mary finished the season with an overall record of 8–4 and a mark of 7–2 in A-10 play, sharing the conference title with Hofstra, Maine, and Villanova. The Tribe was ranked No. 17 in the final Sports Network poll. They qualified for the NCAA Division I-AA playoffs, losing to Appalachian State in the first round.

Schedule

References

William and Mary
William & Mary Tribe football seasons
Atlantic 10 Conference football champion seasons
William and Mary Indians football